The Gorgon (Tomi Shishido) is a fictional supervillain appearing in American comic books published by Marvel Comics.

Publication history

The Gorgon first appeared in Wolverine vol. 3 #20, and was created by Mark Millar and John Romita Jr. The character was killed in Wolverine vol. 3 #31, only to be resurrected later in Secret Warriors #2.

Fictional character biography
Tomi Shishido is a member of the Hand and Hydra and a powerful mutant, leading the extremist mutant society Dawn of the White Light. As a child, he possessed near superhuman levels of intelligence. Shishido said his first words at two weeks of age, could walk at three months, and was able to read and write by his first birthday. He became an accomplished painter by age four, among the top artists in all of Japan and composed an opera at age six. This is also the age when Shishido attempted a second suicide.

At age 13, Shishido formulated a mathematical formula that proves the existence of One-Above-All and manifested the mutant ability to turn people to stone just by looking at them. The media dubbed him as "The Gorgon", after the Gorgon of Greek mythology. Shortly after, he was the leader of a mutant death-cult called the Dawn of the White Light, which committed terrorist attacks throughout Japan. By age 18, he sought out the Hand. Before leaving his home, he killed his entire family and his only friend to prove that he was ruthless enough to join the terrorist organization.

After finding the Hand sanctuary and slaying all of its guards while blindfolded, the Gorgon went inside and pledged his allegiance to the Hand's Jonin. When the master questioned his dedication, the Gorgon impaled himself with his own sword, fatally injuring himself, and told the master to resurrect him. The Jonin were impressed and brought him into the fold.

Later, the Gorgon became connected to Hydra and formed a relationship with Elsbeth Von Strucker (the wife of Hydra leader Baron Strucker). He's responsible for the capture of Wolverine. Under the Gorgon's brain washing control, Wolverine managed to infiltrate the Baxter Building and steal technological blueprints from Reed Richards that were very useful to Hydra, and committed a number of terrorist attacks resulting in the deaths of numerous costumed heroes and hundreds of S.H.I.E.L.D. agents before being finally caught during an assault on the X-Mansion and subsequently deprogrammed. Eventually, the Gorgon attempted to assassinate Nick Fury after S.H.I.E.L.D. launched an attack which destroyed a safe-house and killed Elsbeth in the process. He was intercepted by Wolverine before he could complete the objective. The two engaged in a brutal battle, inflicting devastating injuries upon one another. The Gorgon managed to gain the upper hand and attempted to use his mutant ability to transform Wolverine into stone; Wolverine's claws were extruded at the last moment, forcing the Gorgon to see his own reflection. As a result, the Gorgon's power was reflected back upon him. Once the Gorgon had been turned into stone, Wolverine shattered his body.

During the "Dark Reign" storyline, Hydra forced The Hand to resurrect the Gorgon using the rock fragments of his body. He is also given the sword Godkiller by Kraken. The Godkiller is destroyed in a battle against Phobos who wields Grasscutter. Gorgon uses the broken blade to slay Phobos with a mortal chest stab and takes Grasscutter as his own, citing "a red sword for a red lord".

Following the "Fear Itself" storyline, Gorgon joins up with H.A.M.M.E.R. after Norman Osborn's reclaimed leadership upon escaping from the Raft. Gorgon ends up being a member of the second incarnation of Dark Avengers as Wolverine. He and the original Madame Hydra secretly plan to kill Osborn if their co-conspirator proves to be too dangerous and use the Dark Avengers to cause discord by serving as a voice of the "disenfranchised" unsatisfied with the status quo. Although he is generally suitable as "Dark Wolverine" due to his skills and healing powers, Gorgon lacks the real Wolverine's claws instead relying on fake claws that are a part of his costume. Gorgon and the Dark Avengers are defeated when their teammate Skaar revealed as a double agent and summons the Avengers to defeat the Dark Avengers.

During the events of Avengers World, Gorgon and the Hand orchestrate a full-scale riot on Madripoor as a distraction from a ritual held at their temple on the island. Although Shang-Chi is able to infiltrate the Hand-based pagoda, it's too late to stop the séance, which raises the island nation out of the water up upon the head of a massive continent-sized dragon. While the massive tarragon is airborne, Shang-Chi effortlessly defeats the Hand ninjas at the temple but is bested in hand-to-hand combat by the Gorgon who throws Shang-Chi off of his great beast several hundred feet below. Tomi and the Hand attack the Circle, the aircity headquarters of China's intelligence-gathering agency S.P.E.A.R on their dragon mounts but are repelled by S.P.E.A.R. superhuman response team, the Ascendants. S.P.E.A.R director Xian Zheng deduces that Gorgon is flying the Mandripoorian dragon to Shanghai, hoping to destroy China as a stepping stone for his empire. Despite S.P.E.A.R and the Ascendants best efforts, the Master Ninja is able to reach Shanghai and observes from his temple while the dragon and the Hand's forces fight the Ascendants and Avengers in the city. However, Shang-Chi (who survived his encounter with the Gorgon and was rescued by S.P.E.A.R) uses Pym Particles supplied by Zheng to grow to the size of a giant and defeats the dragon in combat. As payback for his earlier defeat and the destruction caused by the Gorgon, Shang-Chi tears off the Hand's temple (with Gorgon screaming still trapped inside) from the dragon's head and throws it several miles away.

Gorgon is part of the Hydra High Council that the new Madame Hydra is collecting to assist Steve Rogers who had history altered to be a Hydra sleeper agent for years.

During the "Secret Empire" storyline, Gorgon and Hive were in Madripoor at the time when the Underground arrives looking for cube fragments. Before being knocked down by Hercules, Gorgon managed to briefly turn him to stone.

Shishido was later behind the Hand's Regenix operations. He is served by Scarlet Samurai who is actually Mariko Yashida resurrected. The two led an attack on Old Man Logan who was investigating the Hand's operations. When the Silver Samurai assisted Old Man Logan, Silver Samurai fought Gorgon while Logan confronted Mariko. After Gorgon got away, Silver Samurai used some nanites to break the Hand's control on Mariko.

During the "Spider-Geddon" storyline, Arnim Zola creates a bio-duplicate of Gorgon who accompanies some Hydra agents to Los Angeles in order to repossess Superior Octopus' services. The Gorgon bio-duplicate fought Superior Octopus and his blindfold-removal had him turn Superior Octopus to stone. After shattering it on Zola's orders, Superior Octopus emerged and beheaded the Gorgon bio-duplicate.

Gorgon is later one of the villainous mutants invited by the Quiet Council of Krakoa to live in their new mutant island nation, provided he no longer holds any grudges against his fellow mutants. The Hand grandmaster accepts and later even drinks a beer with Wolverine during a party. He became part of Krakoa's security force the "Great Captains of Krakoa" and served as a bodyguard for Xavier, Magneto and Apocalypse at political events.

He took part in Saturnyne's X of Swords contest against Arakko, where he singlehandedly turned the tide of the tournament in Krakoa's favor in the penultimate round by defeating 13 of White Sword of the Ivory Spire's One Hundred champions, before dying at the hand of White Sword himself. White Sword offered to resurrect him as one of his champions as a reward for his bravery, but he declined and was praised as a hero upon his death.

Gorgon was resurrected on Krakoa by The Five, but due to dying in Otherworld he was brought back broken. Fabian Cortez tried to take advantage of his brain damage by taking him to Central Park and strengthening his telepathy so he could hear all the hateful things people were thinking about him. Fabian hoped to use Gorgon to kill all these people so he could bypass Krakoa's first law "Murder No Man" without punishment, however Nightcrawler intervened and teleported into an ice cream stand, making everybody laugh. This allowed the confused Gorgon to calm down and he began serving humans ice cream, much to Fabian's dismay. He later helped Nightcrawler defeat Onslaught, and joined his team of Krakoan peacekeepers "The Legionaries". He also unsuccessfully applied to be both a member of the X-Men, and a member of the Quiet Council.

Powers and abilities
The Gorgon possesses a variety of superhuman abilities as a result of genetic mutation and mystical enhancement from the Hand.

The Gorgon's primary mutant ability is the ability to transform an individual into stone by making eye contact with them. Gorgon's eyes have no visible features, glowing with a bright green energy. The Gorgon often wears a mask or pair of dark sunglasses in order to see without affecting those around him. Whether said face wear possess any sort of special properties or are composed of some special material designed to block his power was never revealed.

He was also born with, or soon achieved, an extraordinary level of intelligence, possibly at a superhuman level, and psionic abilities. He possesses advanced knowledge in multiple academic and artistic fields. This intellect makes him extremely arrogant. For some reason he equates intelligence with being a mutant. For example, Gorgon dismisses Reed Richards as simply the equivalent of a parrot that can mimic a human voice, despite the fact that Gorgon was actually impressed by Richards' ideas, simply because Richards is not a mutant.

After his resurrection, the Gorgon's strength, speed, reflexes/reactions, agility, dexterity, coordination, balance, and endurance are all heightened to superhuman levels, the exact limits of which are unrevealed. Tomi also possesses an accelerated healing factor that enables him to repair damaged or destroyed tissue with extraordinary speed and efficiency. He is capable of healing from massive trauma inflicted by Wolverine's adamantium claws, bludgeoning, and falling from great heights while continuing to fight.

Aside from his physical advantages, Mr. Shishido possesses some level of telepathy/empathy allowing him to hear the thoughts and feel the emotions of others. His telepathy also enables him to perceive his surroundings if necessary, such as when he's blindfolded. Much like his physical capabilities, the exact limits of the Gorgon's psionic powers remain unknown.

The Gorgon is an extraordinary hand-to-hand combatant, even before his resurrection, trained in multiple forms of martial arts. He is an expert swordsman and typically prefers to use a katana during combat. Also, he typically uses his psionic abilities to read the minds of his opponents during combat situations (even highly trained minds like Wolverine's and Elektra's), enabling him to predict and counter their every move. He has used swords and a personal teleportation device. He currently wields Godkiller, a sword that has killed many kings, emperors, and had also made a god bleed.

On top of various mutant powers and his acquired skill set, the Gorgon also has high-end ties to various criminal sects and their resources; many such innovations in his possession come from underworld affiliates such as A.I.M, The Hand and Hydra. He's also adept at ninjutsu and skilled in the dark arts; able to resurrect the formerly dead who serve his bidding as well as enact rituals which enable him to raise ancient creatures from eternal slumber.

In other media

Television
The Gorgon is mentioned in The Avengers: Earth's Mightiest Heroes episode "Widow's Sting" as the Yashida Clan's head; Madame Hydra tells Baron Strucker that the Gorgon and the Yashida Clan have pledged allegiance to Hydra.

Video games
 The Gorgon appears in Marvel Heroes, voiced by Crispin Freeman.
 The Gorgon appears as a boss in Marvel Puzzle Quest.

References

External links
 Gorgon (Tomi Shishido) at Marvel.com

Fictional characters with superhuman durability or invulnerability
Fictional swordfighters in comics
Fictional ninja
Fictional Japanese people
Hydra (comics) agents
Marvel Comics martial artists
Marvel Comics mutants
Marvel Comics characters who can move at superhuman speeds
Marvel Comics characters who can teleport
Marvel Comics characters with accelerated healing
Marvel Comics characters with superhuman strength
Marvel Comics supervillains
Marvel Comics telepaths
Comics characters introduced in 2004
Characters created by Mark Millar
Characters created by John Romita Jr.